This list contains the 50 Governors of states in the United States who have served for the longest years consecutively or otherwise. Territorial and colonial governors are not included.

References

United States governors
State governors of the United States